Odd Reidar Humlegård (born 9 May 1961, in Porsgrunn) is a Norwegian lawyer, civil servant and the current National Police Commissioner. Humlegård previously served as head of the National Criminal Investigation Service, and was appointed as director to the National Police Directorate in August 2012 after the controversial resignation of Øystein Mæland.

Career
Humlegård first joined the Norwegian police in 1984, after graduating from Norwegian Police University College, having previously received officer's training at the Military Academy. He later enrolled in- and graduated from law school in 1992. From 2003 he served as head of the National Mobile Police Service, before he was appointed to the National Criminal Investigation Service in 2009. He was responsible for the investigation of many high-profile cases during his tenure, such as The Pocket Man in 2009.

In the wake of the sudden resignation of Øystein Mæland in 2012, he was promptly appointed to the position as the next Police Commissioner, basically in charge of the whole police force.

References

Living people
Norwegian civil servants
Norwegian jurists
Norwegian police chiefs
People from Porsgrunn
1961 births